Sylvie Bérard (born 1965) is a Canadian academic and science fiction writer.

Born in Montreal, she studied semiotics at the Université du Québec à Montréal and went on to lecture for the Department of French and perform post-doctoral research at the University of Toronto. She later lectured on Quebec literature at Trent University; she also was director of the Department of languages and modern literature.

Bérard began publishing short stories in 1987. Her short story "La Guerre sans temps" received a Prix Aurora Award. She has published articles in a number of scholarly journals. She is also a member of the editorial board for the journal XYZ.

Selected works 
 Elle meurt à la fin, novel (1993) with Brigitte Caron
 Les 50 romans d'amour qu'il faut lire (1996) with Julia Bettinotti and Gaëlle Jeanneson
 Terre des Autres (2004), translated as Of Wind and Sand (2009), received the Prix des lecteurs de Radio-Canada
 La Saga d'Illyge (2011), nominated for an Aurora award

References 

1965 births
Living people
Canadian science fiction writers
Canadian short story writers in French
Canadian women short story writers
French Quebecers
Université du Québec alumni
Academic staff of the University of Toronto
Academic staff of Trent University
Writers from Montreal
Women science fiction and fantasy writers
Canadian novelists in French
Canadian women novelists
20th-century Canadian novelists
20th-century Canadian short story writers
20th-century Canadian women writers
21st-century Canadian novelists
21st-century Canadian short story writers
21st-century Canadian women writers